National Secondary Route 126, or just Route 126 (or ) is a National Road Route of Costa Rica, located in the Alajuela, Heredia provinces. It connects  Route 3 and Route 4.

Description

Starting at the downtown area of Heredia canton, at Route 3, this road goes through Heredia, Barva, Carrizal, and Varablanca slightly following the province limit between Heredia and Alajuela, until arriving to Route 4 at Bajos de Chilamate in Sarapiquí.

It allows access to the Poás Volcano National Park when driving from Heredia, by turning at Route 120.

In the southern area of the route, near Barva canton, there are many coffee plantations, and further north in Varablanca there are strawberry orchards.

Making use of the eastern lowlands segment of Route 32 and Route 4, this route connects the Greater Metropolitan Area to the Caribbean districts, which is a recommended alternate route in case of emergency when there are landslides in the Braulio Carrillo national park section of Route 32.

In Alajuela province the route covers Alajuela canton (Carrizal, San Isidro, Sarapiquí districts).

In Heredia province the route covers Heredia canton (Heredia, Mercedes, Varablanca districts), Barva canton (Barva, San Pedro, San Pablo districts), Santa Bárbara canton (Jesús, Santo Domingo, Purabá districts), Sarapiquí canton (La Virgen district).

Locations
Administrative regions covered by this route and their junctions at the district level.

History

An historic route in the country, an approximate route was used to export goods to Europe by the Spanish colonials.

Was partially destroyed by the 2009 Cinchona earthquake, reconstruction took five years and was concluded on 2014.

La Paz waterfall bridges
The scenic spot to overlook La Paz waterfall, on the La Paz Grande river, is served by a bridge that has been destroyed two times, in 2003 the 65 years old original wood bridge fell due to heavy machinery transportation, a Bailey bridge was installed, which due to a torrential storm, was destroyed by the river in 2013. A new Bailey bridge was again installed, a meter higher than before, opened in September 2013.

References

Highways in Costa Rica